Baherden District is a district of Ahal Province, Turkmenistan. From 2003 to 2018 it was named Baharly ("spring-like") District.

History

It was formed in January 1926 as the Bakharden District of the Poltoratsk District of the Turkmen SSR. Its administrative center was Bakharden Station. In August 1926 the Poltoratsk District was abolished, and the Bakharden District was directly subordinated to the Turkmen SSR.

In November 1939, the region was assigned to the newly formed Ashkhabad oblast. In May 1959, Ashgabat oblast was abolished and the district again became a direct subordination of the Turkmen SSR. In 1963, the Bakharden District was abolished, but in 1965 it was reёstablished. In December 1973, Ashgabat oblast was recreated, which included the Bakharden district. In 1988, Ashgabat oblast was again abolished and the district was directly subordinated to the Turkmen SSR. 

On 23 October 2003, by Presidential Decree 6435 the city and district (etrap) of Bäherden were renamed Baharly (“spring-like”). On 5 January 2018, by Parliamentary Resolution No. 686-V, Baharly city and district (etrap) had their old name of Bäherden restored.

References

Districts of Turkmenistan
Ahal Region